Aciditerrimonas ferrireducens  is a Gram-positive, iron-reducing, moderately thermophilic, short rod-shaped, acidophilic and motile bacterium from the genus Aciditerrimonas which has been isolated from soil from a solfataric field in Ōwakudani in Japan.

References

External links 
Type strain of Aciditerrimonas ferrireducens at BacDive -  the Bacterial Diversity Metadatabase

Actinomycetota
Bacteria described in 2011
Thermophiles